The 1917 West Virginia Mountaineers football team was an American football team that represented West Virginia University as an independent during the 1917 college football season. In its second season under head coach Mont McIntire, the team compiled a 6–3–1 record and outscored opponents by a total of 161 to 50.

Schedule

References

West Virginia
West Virginia Mountaineers football seasons
West Virginia Mountaineers football